Christopher Whittle may refer to:

Christopher H. Whittle, educator, paleontologist, artist, and explorer
Chris Whittle, American entrepreneur, best known for founding Edison Schools, Inc.